The Cebidae are one of the five families of New World monkeys now recognised. Extant members are the capuchin and squirrel monkeys. These species are found throughout tropical and subtropical South and Central America.

Characteristics
Cebid monkeys are arboreal animals that only rarely travel on the ground. They are generally small monkeys, ranging in size  up to that of the brown capuchin, with a body length of 33 to 56 cm, and a weight of 2.5 to 3.9 kilograms. They are somewhat variable in form and coloration, but all have the wide, flat, noses typical of New World monkeys.

They are omnivorous, mostly eating fruit and insects, although the proportions of these foods vary greatly between species. They have the dental formula:

Females give birth to one or two young after a gestation period of between 130 and 170 days, depending on species. They are social animals, living in groups of between five and forty individuals, with the smaller species typically forming larger groups. They are generally diurnal in habit.

Classification
Previously, New World monkeys were divided between Callitrichidae and this family. For a few recent years, marmosets, tamarins, and lion tamarins were placed as a subfamily (Callitrichinae) in Cebidae, while moving other genera from Cebidae into the families Aotidae, Pitheciidae and Atelidae. The most recent classification of New World monkeys again splits the callitrichids off, leaving only the capuchins and squirrel monkeys in this family.

 Subfamily Cebinae (capuchin monkeys)
 Genus Cebus (gracile capuchin monkeys)
 Colombian white-faced capuchin or Colombian white-headed capuchin, Cebus capucinus
 Panamanian white-faced capuchin or Panamanian white-headed capuchin, Cebus imitator
 Marañón white-fronted capuchin, Cebus yuracus
 Shock-headed capuchin, Cebus cuscinus
 Spix's white-fronted capuchin, Cebus unicolor
 Humboldt's white-fronted capuchin, Cebus albifrons
 Guianan weeper capuchin, Cebus olivaceus
 Chestnut capuchin, Cebus castaneus
 Ka'apor capuchin, Cebus kaapori
 Venezuelan brown capuchin, Cebus brunneus
 Sierra de Perijá white-fronted capuchin, Cebus leucocephalus
 Río Cesar white-fronted capuchin, Cebus cesare
 Varied white-fronted capuchin, Cebus versicolor
 Santa Marta white-fronted capuchin, Cebus malitiosus
 Ecuadorian white-fronted capuchin, Cebus aequatorialis
 Genus Sapajus (robust capuchin monkeys)
 Tufted capuchin, Sapajus apella
 Blond capuchin, Sapajus flavius
 Black-striped capuchin, Sapajus libidinosus
 Azaras's capuchin, Sapajus cay
 Black capuchin, Sapajus nigritus
 Crested capuchin, Sapajus robustus
 Golden-bellied capuchin, Sapajus xanthosternos
 Subfamily Saimiriinae (squirrel monkeys)
 Genus Saimiri
 Bare-eared squirrel monkey, Saimiri ustus
 Black squirrel monkey, Saimiri vanzolinii
 Black-capped squirrel monkey, Saimiri boliviensis
 Central American squirrel monkey, Saimiri oerstedi
 Guianan squirrel monkey, Saimiri sciureus
 Humboldt's squirrel monkey, Saimiri cassiquiarensis
 Collins' squirrel monkey, Saimiri collinsi

Extinct taxa
Genus Panamacebus
Panamacebus transitus
Subfamily Cebinae
Genus Acrecebus
Acrecebus fraileyi
Genus Killikaike
Killikaike blakei
Genus Dolichocebus
Dolichocebus gaimanensis
Subfamily Saimiriinae
Genus Saimiri
Saimiri fieldsi
Saimiri annectens
Genus Patasola
Patasola magdalenae

References

 
New World monkeys
Primate families
Taxa named by Charles Lucien Bonaparte
Taxa described in 1831